Miloš Vujanić (born November 13, 1980) is a Serbian professional basketball coach and former player. A two-time All-EuroLeague selection, he won the EuroLeague championship with Panathinaikos, in 2007.

Professional career
Vujanić started his professional career with Crvena zvezda (Red Star Belgrade), in 1999. After two seasons at the club, he signed with Partizan Belgrade, in the summer of 2001. In the 2002 NBA Draft, Vujanić was selected with the 36th overall pick, by the New York Knicks, but later, his draft rights were traded to the Phoenix Suns. However, he decided to stay with Partizan for one more season, and he was the top scorer of the EuroLeague's 2002–03 season, averaging 25.8 points per game. In the summer of 2003, he moved to the Italian League, and signed a three-year deal with Skipper Bologna.

Vujanić ended up never playing in an NBA game and he is 1 of 9 players from the 2002 NBA Draft to never play a game in the league.

National team career
With the senior FR Yugoslav national team, Vujanić won the gold medal at the 2002 FIBA World Championship, in Indianapolis. He was also a member of the senior Serbia and Montenegro national team (renamed from FR Yugoslavia national team) at the 2003 EuroBasket, and at the 2004 Summer Olympics.

Career statistics

|-
| style="text-align:left;"| 2001–02
| style="text-align:left;"| Partizan
| 12 || 7 || 27.9 || .455 || .386 || .750 || 3.0 || 2.8 || .8 || .1 || 13.5 || 10.5
|-
| style="text-align:left;"| 2002–03
| style="text-align:left;"| Partizan
| 14 || 12 || 34.3 || .418 || .408 || .844 || 1.9 || 3.2 || 1.1 || .0 || style="background:#cfecec;"|25.8 || 24.0
|-
| style="text-align:left;"| 2003–04
| style="text-align:left;"| Fortitudo
| 20 || 16 || 29.2 || .456 || .385 || .835 || 1.7 || 1.8 || 1.3 || .0 || 16.3 || 13.6
|-
| style="text-align:left;"| 2004–05
| style="text-align:left;"| Fortitudo
| 20 || 20 || 29.3 || .449 || .338 || .781 || 2.9 || 2.5 || 1.4 || .1 || 16.6 || 16.1
|-
| style="text-align:left;"| 2005–06
| style="text-align:left;"| Barcelona
| 4 || 1 || 11.6 || .400 || .000 || 1.000 || .3 || 1.0 || .5 || .0 || 2.5 || 1.0
|-
| style="text-align:left;background:#AFE6BA;"| 2006–07†
| style="text-align:left;"| Panathinaikos
| 19 || 0 || 14.4 || .347 || .345 || .771 || .4 || .7 || .5 || .0 || 5.6 || 2.5
|-
| style="text-align:left;"| 2007–08
| style="text-align:left;"| Panathinaikos
| 2 || 0 || 6.9 || .666 || 1.000 || .500 || .0 || .0 || .0 || .0 || 3.0 || 1.5
|-
| style="text-align:left;"| 2008–09
| style="text-align:left;"| Efes Pilsen
| 10 || 7 || 25.4 || .507 || .361 || .800 || 1.8 || 1.7 || 1.0 || .1 || 10.9 || 9.5
|- class="sortbottom"
| style="text-align:left;"| Career
| style="text-align:left;"|
| 101 || 63 || 25.5 || .441 || .370 || .810 || 1.8 || 2.0 || 1.0 || .0 || 14.0 || 11.9

See also 
 List of NBA drafted players from Serbia
 New York Knicks draft history

References

External links
 Miloš Vujanić at acb.com 
 Miloš Vujanić at archive.fiba.com 
 Miloš Vujanić at draftexpress.com
 Miloš Vujanić at euroleague.net
 Miloš Vujanić at fibaeurope.com
 Miloš Vujanić at legabasket.it 

1980 births
Living people
2002 FIBA World Championship players
Anadolu Efes S.K. players
Basketball players at the 2004 Summer Olympics
BC Dynamo Moscow players
CB Murcia players
FC Barcelona Bàsquet players
FIBA World Championship-winning players
Fortitudo Pallacanestro Bologna players
Greek Basket League players
KK Crvena zvezda players
KK Partizan players
Liga ACB players
Lega Basket Serie A players
New York Knicks draft picks
Olympic basketball players of Serbia and Montenegro
Panathinaikos B.C. players
Panionios B.C. players
Sportspeople from Loznica
Point guards
Serbian men's basketball coaches
Serbian men's basketball players
Serbian expatriate basketball people in Italy
Serbian expatriate basketball people in Spain
Serbian expatriate basketball people in Greece
Serbian expatriate basketball people in Turkey
Serbian expatriate basketball people in Russia
Shooting guards
Universiade medalists in basketball
Universiade gold medalists for Yugoslavia
Universiade silver medalists for Yugoslavia
Medalists at the 2001 Summer Universiade